Mitlatongo-Yutanduchi Mixtec is a Mixtec language of southern Oaxaca. The two varieties, Mitlatongo (Santiago Mitlatongo & Santa Cruz Mitlatongo) and Yutanduchi (Yutanduchi de Guerrero), are quite distinct, at about 70% intelligibility.

References 

Mixtec language